Prince Rui of the First Rank (hošoi sabingga cin wang), or simply Prince Rui, was the title of a princely peerage used in China during the Manchu-led Qing dynasty (1636–1912). As the Prince Rui peerage was not awarded "iron-cap" status, this meant that each successive bearer of the title would normally start off with a title downgraded by one rank vis-à-vis that held by his predecessor. However, the title would generally not be downgraded to any lower than a feng'en fuguo gong except under special circumstances.

The first bearer of the title was Mianxin (綿忻; 1805–1828), the Jiaqing Emperor's fourth son, who was made "Prince Rui of the First Rank" in 1819. It was briefly renamed to Prince Duan of the Second Rank (Prince Duan) between 1894 and 1900 when Zaiyi inherited the title. The title was passed down over three generations and held by four persons.

Members of the Prince Rui peerage

 Mianxin (綿忻; 1805–1828), the Jiaqing Emperor's fourth son, held the title Prince Rui of the First Rank from 1819 to 1828, posthumously honoured as Prince Ruihuai of the First Rank (瑞懷親王)
 Yizhi (奕誌; 1827–1850), Mianxin's eldest son, held the title Prince Rui of the Second Rank from 1828 to 1850, posthumously honoured as Prince Ruimin of the Second Rank (瑞敏郡王)
 Zaiyi (1856–1922), Yicong's second son and Yizhi's adopted son, held the title of a beile from 1861 to 1894, made an acting junwang in 1889, succeeded Yizhi under the title "Prince Duan of the Second Rank" in 1894, stripped of his title in 1900
 Zaixun (1885–1949), Yixuan's sixth son and Yizhi's adopted son, initially a buru bafen fuguo gong from 1887 to 1889, promoted to feng'en fuguo gong in 1889 and feng'en zhenguo gong in 1890, made a beile in 1902 and an acting junwang in 1908

Family tree

|-
|Legend:
 - Title bearers
 - Emperors
|-
|

See also
 Royal and noble ranks of the Qing dynasty

References
 

Qing dynasty princely peerages
Peerages of the Bordered Red Banner